Mother Ship is an album by American organist Larry Young, recorded in 1969 but not released on the Blue Note label until 1980.

Reception
The AllMusic review by Scott Yanow awarded the album 4 stars and stated "This highly original set does not deserve to be so obscure."

Track listing
All compositions by Larry Young
 "Mother Ship" - 7:38
 "Street Scene" - 6:56
 "Visions" - 6:44
 "Trip Merchant" - 12:53
 "Love Drops" - 7:06
Recorded at Rudy Van Gelder Studio, Englewood Cliffs, New Jersey on February 7, 1969

Personnel
Larry Young - organ
Lee Morgan - trumpet
Herbert Morgan - tenor saxophone
Eddie Gladden - drums

References

Blue Note Records albums
Larry Young (musician) albums
1980 albums
Albums recorded at Van Gelder Studio
Albums produced by Alfred Lion